Paul Éluard was a 20th century French surrealist poet.

Éluard or Eluard may also refer to

 Gala Éluard, the poet's first wife
 Nusch Éluard, the poet's second wife
 15752 Eluard, a Solar system minor planet named after the poet

See also 
 Lycée Paul Éluard (disambiguation), the name of the several French schools